"The Very Best of Brand Nubian" is a greatest hits album by hip hop group Brand Nubian. The front cover of an album is reference to the debut album by Brand Nubian.

Track listing

 The tracks 9 and 10 are performed by Grand Puba

References

Brand Nubian albums
2001 greatest hits albums
Hip hop compilation albums
Elektra Records compilation albums